Tongcheng Secondary School is a secondary school in Tongcheng, Anhui, China.

Notable alumni 
 Chu Bo (zh: 儲波) - Former Governor of Hunan Province
 Ci Yungui (zh: 慈云桂) - Government official
 Fang Chih (zh: 方治) - Chinese diplomat
 Fang Dongmei (zh: 方东美) - Author, philosopher
 Huang Zhen (zh: 黄镇) - Chinese general
 Lu Dadao (zh: 陆大道) - Author
 Shi Congyun - (zh: 施从云) - Qing warlord during the Xinhai Revolution
 Wang Sheng (zh: 王胜) - Huaiyuan County Warlord
 Wu Zipei (zh: 吴子培) - Revolutionary figure
 Yu Guanglang (zh: 余光烺) - Revolutionary figure
 Zhang Bojun - Revolutionary figure, mayor of Beiping
 Zhu Guangqian - Author and activist Chaturbhuj Tripathi

References 

High schools in Anhui
Tongcheng, Anhui